The 1921 Saskatchewan general election was held on June 9, 1921, to elect members of the Legislative Assembly of Saskatchewan.

The Liberal Party of Saskatchewan of Premier William M. Martin was re-elected – although with a diminished share of the popular vote, and a reduced caucus in the legislature.

The opposition Conservative Party – led by Donald McLean – fractured: it nominated only seven candidates, and won only two seats. Its share of the popular vote fell from about 36% to less than 4%.

It appears that many Conservatives ran as independents or Independent Conservatives. These two groups won over 29% of the vote, and voters elected a total of eight Members of the Legislative Assembly (MLAs) under these banners.

The Progressive Party of Saskatchewan made its first appearance, winning six of the seven ridings that it contested.

Results

Note: * Party did not nominate candidates in previous election.

Percentages

Members of the Legislative Assembly elected
For complete electoral history, see individual districts

August 9, 1921

Note: George Langley was acclaimed on August 9, 1921 as no other candidate stepped forward during the election.

See also
List of Saskatchewan political parties
List of Saskatchewan provincial electoral districts

References
Saskatchewan Archives Board – Election Results By Electoral Division
Elections Saskatchewan - Provincial Vote Summaries

Further reading
 

1921 elections in Canada
1921 in Saskatchewan
1921
June 1921 events